The 2022 County Championship (referred to as the LV= Insurance County Championship for sponsorship reasons) was the 122nd cricket County Championship season in England and Wales. The season began on 7 April and ended on 29 September 2022. Warwickshire were the defending champions.

In October 2021, the England and Wales Cricket Board (ECB) announced that the tournament would return to the format of two divisions, with ten teams in Division One, and eight teams in Division Two. The teams were placed into the division they qualified for following the 2019 County Championship, after the 2020 season was completely cancelled due to the COVID-19 pandemic. In January 2022, the ECB confirmed all the fixtures for the tournament, with the Bob Willis Trophy being scrapped. 

On 28 April 2022, Ben Stokes was named as England's new Test captain, replacing Joe Root. On 6 May 2022, in Stokes' first match since becoming England's captain, he hit 17 sixes against Worcestershire, setting a new record for sixes hit in a single innings of a match in the County Championship. Stokes scored 161 runs from 88 balls, which included the fastest century in first-class cricket by a Durham player.

In May 2022, in the Division One match between Surrey and Kent, Surrey set a new first-class cricket record for the highest innings score without a batter scoring a century, when they made 671/9 declared. In the process, Surrey also equalled the first-class record of seven for batters making a half-century without going on to reach triple figures. In July 2022, in Kent's match against Warwickshire, Sam Billings set a new record for the most catches in a County Championship match with twelve. Also in July 2022, Sam Northeast scored the third-highest score in a County Championship match, with 410 not out for Glamorgan against Leicestershire.

Teams
The teams were split based on the finishing positions in the 2019 season, the last before two seasons were affected by the COVID-19 pandemic. The following teams took part in the County Championship:

Division One
 Team promoted from Division Two in 2019

Division Two
 Team relegated from Division One in 2019

Division One

April

May

June

July

September

Division Two

April

May

June

July

September

Standings

Teams in both divisions will play a total of 14 games, with seven home matches and seven away matches. There is a two-up, two-down promotion and relegation system.

Teams receive 16 points for a win and 8 for a draw or tie. Bonus points (a maximum of 5 batting points and 3 bowling points) may be scored during the first 110 overs of each team's first innings.

Division One

Division Two

References

External links
 Division 1 at ESPN Cricinfo
 Division 2 at ESPN Cricinfo

2022
County Championship